Inner Harbour ferry services was a name used for ferry services connecting suburbs on the foreshore of the inner Sydney Harbour with Circular Quay by commuter ferry. Since 2017 this name is no longer used and all services have reverted to individual names

Current Services

 Neutral Bay F5 services - Circular Quay, Kirribilli, North Sydney, Neutral Bay and Kurraba Point

 Mosman F6 services - Circular Quay, Cremorne Point, South Mosman, Old Cremorne and Mosman Bay

Past Services

 Darling Harbour services - Circular Quay, Milsons Point, McMahon Point, Balmain East, Barangaroo and Pyrmont Bay

In October 2017 this was reorganised to become the Cross Harbour ferry services which are no longer considered part of the Inner Harbour services.

Patronage
The following chart shows the relative patronage of Sydney Ferries' seven lines in the 2016-17 financial year.

Gallery

References 

Ferry transport in Sydney